The Ghost boat investigation is a project looking into a group of at least 243 refugees who disappeared in the summer of 2014.  None of the missing people have contacted their family members, and there have been no bodies found or wreckage of any kind. One theory is that a people smuggling boat off the coast of Libya, intending to sail to Italy, disappeared without trace. A lack of wreckage is highly unusual for such a large watercraft. Reporter Eric Reidy has been investigating the case by blogging and using crowd sourcing. Bobbie Johnson, a senior editor at Medium, took Reidy's articles and created the Ghost Boat project to help track the missing group of "Ghost boat" refugees. , no trace of the passengers has been found.

The boat, the smugglers, the passengers

Each of the 243 in the group who were to leave Libya paid $1600 to get to Europe. Measho Tesfamariam arranged the trip and "handled communication, logistics, and payment for the big smugglers". There were three other individuals who helped fill the boat: Ibrahim, Jamal el-Saoudi, and Jaber all of whom have Sudanese passports (although Jamal is Eritrean). Ibrahim was in charge of arranging the trip and the passengers and families' contact. Measho Tesfamariam says that the boat was due to depart from the Libyan Khums (Al-Khums) beach, but he didn't witness the departure. Tesfamariam was arrested on December 2, 2014 on people-smuggling charges.  Meanwhile, Eritrean Jamal el-Saoudi, who was the manager of the Tokhla group smuggling operation that arranged the ghost boat group's journey, lives in Libya where he is a well-connected man.

Most of the passengers were Eritreans fleeing the highly repressive military regime that rules the country. 5,000 Eritreans flee the country a month.

Investigation

Experts say that such a large boat sinking would have left some trace. “It’s really strange,” says Othman Belbeisi, who is the International Organization for Migration’s country director for Libya. Refugee advocate and migration expert Fausto Melluso with the Italian organization Arci in Sicily, says that “It is inconceivable that a boat with that many people can go missing in 2014 and nobody know about it.” Dr. Alganesh Fisseha an Eritrean political activist who fled the country herself is an expert on refugee issues. She said that it was the "first time she has heard of such a large group of people going missing without a trace. ... 'It is impossible that they disappeared into thin air'” During the Lampedusa migrant shipwreck on October 12, 2013 more than 360 deaths were reported, with just 155 survivors. In that case bodies were spread out over the ocean.

Eric Reidy had been working as a reporter in Tunisia when he heard that famed refugee activist Meron Estefanos was investigating reports surrounding the ghost boat. She was looking into a mysterious phone call to relatives of those on the ghost boat that the passengers were detained in a Tunisian prison. However further digging revealed that the phone calls turned out to be a false lead.

See also 
 Human trafficking in Eritrea

Bibliography 
Notes

References 

 

Migrant shipwreck
Migrant shipwreck
Maritime incidents in Libya
Mass disappearances
Transport disasters involving refugees of the Arab Winter (2011–present)
Illegal immigration to Italy